Agnipravesham, also called Agnipariksha is the mythical practice of self-immolation described in Hindu literature. It is primarily associated with the ordeal of Sita in the Ramayana, and is regarded to be a custom inspired by Vedic tradition.

Legend 
In the last book of the Ramayana, Sita undergoes the agnipravesham to offer evidence of her purity to her husband, Rama, and the people of Ayodhya, after suspicions are cast upon her virtue due to her abduction by Ravana. She invokes Agni, the god of fire, who rescues her, thereby testifying to her fidelity to Rama.

See also 
 Ramayana
 Trial by ordeal
 Sati

References 

Religion and suicide
Cultural anthropology
Hindu practices
Religion and euthanasia